Hunts Creek, an urban watercourse that is part of the Parramatta River catchment, is located in Greater Western Sydney, New South Wales, Australia.

Course 

History 
In 1818 William Seville was 'granted fifty acres of land at Broken Back Ridge' bounded by the creek. Following the death of William, his son Joseph Seville was granted the land and transferred 25 acres to his sister, Elizabeth Hunt (née Seville) in 1833. He subsequently granted land in 1836 to his brother-in-law Samuel Hunt, after whom the creek is named.

Hunts Creek provided the water supply for Parramatta and the surrounding district between 1856 and 1909.

See also 

 Rivers of New South Wales

References 

Creeks and canals of Sydney
Parramatta River
The Hills Shire
City of Parramatta